Silvana Tenreyro  (born 6 September 1973) is a British-Argentine economist who is Professor of Economics at the London School of Economics and External Member of the Bank of England's Monetary Policy Committee since July 2017. She currently serves as the president of the European Economic Association for 2021.

She graduated with a BA (summa cum laude) from the National University of Tucumán, Argentina in 1997, followed by an MA and PhD in economics at Harvard University where she was supervised by Robert Barro, Alberto Alesina and Kenneth Rogoff.

She was appointed to a three-year term on the Bank of England Monetary Policy Committee from July 2017, and was reappointed for a second term from July 2020. She has been a professor of economics at the London School of Economics. She worked at the US Federal Reserve Bank of Boston from 2002 to 2004 and at the Bank of Mauritius from 2012 to 2014.

Tenreyro was elected Fellow of the British Academy (FBA) in July 2018. In 2021 she was named a Fellow of the Econometric Society. She has British, Italian and Argentine citizenships.

References

External links
 LSE page with links to her journal articles
 

Living people
National University of Tucumán alumni
Harvard University alumni
Academics of the London School of Economics
Argentine economists
Argentine women economists
Fellows of the British Academy
1973 births
Fellows of the European Economic Association
Fellows of the Econometric Society